The Compagnie du chemin de fer Grand-Central de France (Grand-Central Railway Company of France), commonly known as the Compagnie du Grand-Central, or more simply the Grand-Central, was a railway company which operated in France from 1853 to 1857.

Recalling the name of the English Grand Junction Railway (1833–1846) or the Grand Trunk Railway Company of Canada (1852–1919), the Grand-Central existed for a brief period in the history of French railways that was marked by a government  keen to instigate public works, notably the extension of the railway network. The new Second Empire regime decided to give railway companies a long-term monopoly over a specific geographical region in return for a greater involvement of the State in constructing a network of branch lines within these territories.

The Grand-Central was disadvantaged by having an isolated network in a rugged geographical area which had limited economic opportunities. It lacked a terminus in Paris or a main line to the capital that benefited from the feeds of branch lines of the type that existing companies had already built. It soon suffered from the manoeuvres of key players (specifically government, competing companies, and bankers), and from the financial crisis that began in 1856.

The Grand-Central story is also a consequence of the business climate of the era and the tussle between the Pereire brothers, with their innovative financial methods executed through the Crédit Mobilier bank, and James de Rothschild and the powerful Banque de France....

These handicaps led to its rapid failure and dismemberment.

Background
The birth of the Second Empire led to the resumption of business confidence and a revived interest in railway securities. Several figures in the new regime had interests in Central France, including the Dordogne deputy Pierre Magne, who was Minister of Public Works and subsequently Minister of Finance and was keen on a line from Limoges to Agen, and Charles de Morny, a deputy from Puy-de-Dôme and president of the Corps Législatif, who owned a sugar factory near Clermont-Ferrand.

Napoleon III decided that economic expansion could be stimulated by encouraging the private sector to invest in major projects, and in particular the extension of the railway network. The Ponts & Chaussées administration was now allowed to grant 99-year concessions and underwrite the bond coupons of the companies behind these projects.

The new regime promoted a scheme of networks centred on a geographical region and served by a main line from which branch lines would extend. This doctrine was set out by de Morny in 1852 during the debate on an act relating to the Lyon-Méditerranée railway. The regime would award railway concessions competitively, and would also use legislation to impose its will.  This would ensure that regions that were not immediately attractive to major investment could be serviced, whilst exercising a degree of control of the companies.

The railways were expected to become more efficient through the operation of coherent routes that avoided transshipment costs and delays between networks; overheads would be reduced and traffic fluctuations could be absorbed. Moreover, thanks to the "network" effect, companies could reduce tariffs to stimulate new traffic. Finally, sustainable long-term revenues would attract investor confidence and assist companies to raise capital.

The rational development of a network within an exclusive region was seen as beneficial to the development of the economy of the region and to the nation as a whole.

This policy was in contrast to that carried out under the July Monarchy, which "feared that the existence of too powerful companies would be a danger to the state and to public power. Hence its preference for fragmented lines and to weaken their grip."

The ambitions of the Paris-Orléans Railway

Context 
From the inception of the July Monarchy, a north-south link lay at the heart of all of schemes promoted by railway interests (the state, companies and bankers). "A revolution in the speed, regularity and capacity of transport is imminent. It is running late and has made its mark abroad before it has in France, leading to an attempt to divert the Mediterranean-North Sea traffic to Trieste and Genoa at the expense of Marseille. It is therefore imperative to build a major Le Havre-Paris-Lyon-Marseille link as quickly as possible." 

The line between Paris and Lyon could either take the Bourbonnais route (the long-established road via the Loire via Montargis, Nevers and Roanne) or the route via Burgundy (sharing the main line to the east, as preferred by the Ponts & Chaussées department). A railways act of 11 June 1842 described such a route through the centre of France without specifying its course.

In October 1844, the Compagnie du chemin de fer du Centre was granted routes between Orléans and Vierzon and then on to Bec d'Allier, at the confluence of the Allier and the Loire, near Nevers, via Bourges, as well as a Vierzon-Châteauroux branch. In reality, the CF du Centre was a cover for the Paris-Orléans railway, and a number of the directors were common to both companies.

The Paris-Orléans was supported by industrial and mining interests from the centre of France, including the Compagnie des mines de la Loire à Saint-Étienne, six out of 21 of whose directors were from the Paris-Orléans (De Rainneville, Benoist d’Azy, Bartholony, de Bousquet, de Mouchy, and Delahante who took over its management from 1853). Other supporters were the Compagnie des Houillères and Fonderies de l'Aveyron in Decazeville (from 1853 onwards), and which was backed by a group of major Protestant finance houses in Paris at the instigation of the Paris-Orléans, and the Compagnie des forges et fonderies de Montluçon, founded by Benoist d’Azy. Benoist d'Azy was also associated with Drouillard, with whom he took over the Société des Fonderies et Forges d'Alès in 1836. In 1837, he took part in the establishing of a new company, Émile Martin et Cie, in Fourchambault.

Culmination 
At the beginning of August 1849, the Paris-Orléans and the CF du Centre joined forces with the Saint-Étienne-Lyon to fight a Paris-Avignon line proposal by the Pereire brothers, which would take over construction of the Paris-Lyon line being undertaken by the state. The Pereires' project was fought by Bartholony and the engineer Paulin Talabot, who were afraid of being locked out of the North-South link.

At the end of August, the CF du Centre, wishing to stop its rivals in Lyon and to extend its own line as far as Givors via the Chemins de fer de Roanne à Saint-Étienne and from Saint-Etienne to Lyon, requested that the Bec d'Allier-Roanne line be financed by a loan guaranteed by the state. This request was ignored as the administration wanted to direct the CF du Centre towards Clermont and Limoges, but Bartholony preferred the route towards Roanne and the Mediterranean (Marseille).

In April 1850, parliament agreed in principle to grant two concessions between Paris and the Mediterranean (Paris-Lyon and Lyon-Avignon); "the line was broken". Consequently, rather than seeking to participate in a joint venture for the whole route, Bartholony limited his ambitions to Paris-Lyon and sought an understanding with Paulin Talabot, who had interests in the Lyon-Avignon line. However, Bartholony did not give up the development of the CF du Centre's network. In 1850, the company sought to benefit from the new concession provided by the 1842 act; first from Bec d'Allier to Roanne, and then towards Clermont, as well as further west from Châteauroux to Argenton-sur-Creuse starting from the line to Limoges. The prospect of a Paris-Lyon line via the Bourbonnais (Paris-Nevers-Roanne-Saint-Étienne) was receding. Eventually, the Paris-Orléans merged with the CF du Centre (which shared the same management team), the Tours-Nantes (which feared competition from the Compagnie de l'Ouest), and the Orleans-Bordeaux (which feared that it would become isolated by competition from the Limoges line). In March 1852 the administration approved these mergers in exchange for the construction of lines to Roanne, Clermont, Limoges and La Rochelle.

Thus, in just a few years, the Paris-Orléans had achieved effective control of central France services, with a prospect of serving the Massif Central via Clermont-Ferrand and Limoges. But in return, they had had to renounce any prospective mergers with the Compagnie du chemin de fer de Lyon à Avignon and the Compagnie du chemin de fer de Marseille à Avignon. Moreover, its expansion towards the south had been blocked by the creation of the Compagnie du Midi, which was in the hands of the Pereire brothers.

The Grand-Central Project

Context 
The government wished to establish a concession to serve the central France and the Midi Pyrenees whilst freeing itself from the influence of the CF Lyon-Méditerranée, which was dominated by the highly enterprising Paulin Talabot, and the increasingly powerful Paris-Orléans, headed by François Bartholoni.

The companies, however, were slow to carry out the proposed work, which needed substantial capital. They were reluctant to invest in the construction of lines into sparsely-populated, difficult to access mountainous terrain. Up to this point, railways had generally followed wide river valleys, or passed from one valley to the other via gentle inclines. A network through the Massif Central required bolder technical solutions.

The government encouraged the creation of new companies whose competition would alarm their wealthy rivals and cause the latter to come to terms with the policy of the State. At the same time, in order to raise the necessary capital, the government supported the creation of a new type of financial institution, Crédit Mobilier, which was set up by the Pereire brothers with Benoît Fould, Victor de Persigny and Morny, amongst others. This financial enterprise was to serve the new regime's plans for the development of the nation's infrastructure (railways, transatlantic ships, docks, the funding of urban renewal in Paris and the provinces, etc.).

A group of Parisian major banks opposed Crédit Mobilier, fearing the emergence of a financial monopoly that would eclipse them. They created a banking syndicate under the leadership of James de Rothschild, the Réunion Financièr.

Realisation 
Up to this point, Morny had supported Bartholony in his hopes of extending the Clermont-Ferrand line into the Massive Central. Similarly, in the light of the threat from a Crédit Mobilier railway monopoly, he supported Bartholony's plan at the end of 1852 to merge the Paris-Orléons, Lyon-Méditerranée and Paris-Lyon lines into a Compagnie des chemins de fer du Sud which would serve the Massif Central. It would have been one of four great networks (Ouest, Nord, Est and Sud) into which France would be partitioned. The Midi would be free to join with the Sud, or to remain independent. But on 1 January 1853, Le Moniteur Universel opposed the government's proposal.,

In addition, deputies from the Massif Central mining areas argued for branch lines to transport their products, particularly from the Aveyron mines which had difficulty shipping their output via the river Lot to Bordeaux. The businessmen asserted that mineral deposits comparable to those found in England could also be found in the Massif Central, but that transport doubled its cost.

With this in mind, representatives from the Aubin mines in the Aveyron coal fields (notably James-Alexandre de Pourtalès |de Pourtalès and Seraincourt) tried to attract investors in England, where the plethora of British railway schemes no longer offered attractive premiums, to invest in a line linking Clermont-Ferrand to Toulouse via Montauban to serve the Massif Central fields. They asked the Duke of Morny to chair the company that would construct the line. Morny incorporated the line from Limoges to Agen, which had been promoted without success by Magne (Minister of Public Works and a deputy from Dordogne) to Bartholony since November 1852, and the direct line from Bordeaux to Lyon via the south of the Massif Central,
in association with Crédit Mobilier, where Morny became a member of the board of directors in 1853 after it had been set up.

Finally, on the initiative of Delahante, the Compagnie des mines de la Loire, which wanted to improve access to its output, agreed with Crédit Mobilier to merge the three small Saint-Etienne area railway companies into a single company with the aim of reconstructing these lines to give a streamlined operation with up-to-date equipment. Agreements were concluded between the three small companies to transfer their operations to a new Compagnie des chemins de fer de jonction du Rhône à la Loire, whose concession was granted by decree on 17 May 1853. The company's statutes were approved on 30 September 1853. Crédit Mobilier subscribed for 10,000 of the 60,000 share capital, and both the Pereire brothers took 1,000 shares. Paris-Orléans now had a connection to Lyon for its Moulins, Saint-Germain-des-Fossés and Roanne lines, and the Pereire brothers were in a stronger position through control of the junctions between the Paris-Lyon line, the Lyon-Méditerranée line and the Paris-Orléans. This situation was not displeasing to the government, which had feared the creation of an over-large Sud network (referred to as supra) in the hands of Bartholony (Paris-Orléans) and Talabot (Lyon-Méditerranée).

Creation of the company 
The Compagnie du chemin de fer Grand-Central de France was registered in July 1853. It was the result of an agreement between Magne and Morny's company for the merger of three railways:
 Clermont-Ferrand to Montauban, viewed as a continuation of the Paris-Clermont line to Aurillac, Montauban, Toulouse and Foix. It served the Brassac and Aveyron coalfields (Firmi, Decazeville, Aubin) via branch lines. This line shared a common 120 km section with the Lyon-Bordeaux line;
 Limoges-Agen, viewed as a continuation of the Paris-Limoges line to Périgueux and Agen, then ultimately the Pyrénées. It passed through Limousin and Dordogne where there were many forges and blast furnaces;
 Lyon-Bordeaux, connecting the main Atlantic port with the most important manufacturing centres of the nation and subsequently Switzerland, northern Italy and central Germany. It used a 110 km section of the Bordeaux-Coutras line, the Saint-Étienne to Lyon segment it already shared, and 120 km of the Aurillac-Lempdes stretch of the Clermont to Montauban line.

Rights to the links from Clermont to Lempdes (59 km), from Montauban to the river Lot and eventually to Figeac (155 km), and from Coutras to Périgueux (74 km), a total of 288 km, were assigned for a 99-year period. The company undertook to build these sections within four years without subsidy or guarantee of bond coupons. These lines had not been the subject of detailed preliminary studies, which explains the lack of precision concerning their course.

The sections from Lempdes to the river Lot (156 km), Limoges to Agen (223 km) and the two gaps (Périgueux-Brive and Brive to Lot completing the Lyon-Bordeaux route (248 km) were transferred provisionally: the State would confirm these concessions within five years.

A total of 627 km of track would be completed in accordance with the provisions of the act establishing major railway lines across France at an estimated cost of F70m to the state (infrastructure) and F50 million to the company (superstructure: track and equipment).

The 30 March 1853 agreement over these permanent and provisional assignments was approved by Imperial decree on 21 April 1853.

The company's articles of association were registered on 28 July 1853 and authorised by Imperial decree.

The F90m capital (180,000 F500 shares; 80,000 placed in Britain et 100,000 placed by Crédit Mobilier, reserving 24,000 for itself)

was underwritten in Paris and London successfully by both business and society

Sitting on the initial board of directors (Article 31 of the company's articles of association) were Morny, as chirman, the Count of Pourtalès-Gorgier, Count Charles de Seraincourt, Gustave Delahante, Calvet-Rogniat, César de Faÿ de La Tour-Maubourg, E.C. Gibiat and, amongst the British directors, Laing (an MP), Masterman and Uzielli (bankers) and Hutchinson (chairman of the London Stock Exchange).

Shortly afterwards, on 26 December 1853, under the aegis of Crédit Mobilier, the Grand-Central  bought the CF du Rhone-Loire (150 km); to "give impetus" to the Grand-Central.

Notes

References

Railway companies of France